Mild hybrids (also known as power-assist hybrids, battery-assisted hybrid vehicles or BAHVs) are generally cars with an internal combustion engine (ICE) equipped with an electric combined motor/generator in a parallel hybrid configuration allowing the engine to be turned off whenever the car is coasting, braking, or stopped, and then quickly restarted once power is again required. Mild hybrids may employ regenerative braking and some level of power assist to the internal combustion engine, but mild hybrids do not have an electric-only mode of propulsion.

Overview

The mild hybrid's electric motor provides greater efficiency through the use of a single device that is essentially an integrated starter/alternator sometimes known as a generator-motor unit. A typical mild-hybrid setup uses a belt-powered generator-motor unit driven off the engine to supply power to a small battery. The generator is also powered through regenerative braking, enabling power that would otherwise be dissipated as heat to be recaptured and recovered for use in powering the vehicle. The small power assist generated by mild-hybrid systems can help supplement the gas engine in low-speed situations or handle the demands of engine start/stop functionality. Vehicles equipped with a mild-hybrid system typically see anywhere from a 1–4 miles per gallon improvement in fuel economy relative to comparable models without the technology.

Mild hybrids do not require the same level of battery power and do not achieve the same levels of fuel economy improvement as compared to full hybrid models. One example is the 2005-07 Chevrolet Silverado, Parallel Hybrid Truck (PHT) a full-size pickup truck with a single 7 kW 3-phase electric motor mounted in the bell-housing between the engine and a conventional 4L60E transmission. Chevrolet was able to get a 10% improvement on the Silverado's city fuel efficiency by shutting down and restarting the engine on demand, and the reduction of parasitic accessory loads. However the PHT had no power assist features or all-electric "electric vehicle" (EV) capability, and very limited regenerative braking features.

Advantages and disadvantages

Compared with a full hybrid vehicle, mild hybrids may provide some of the benefits of the application of hybrid technologies, with less of the cost–weight penalty that is incurred by installing a full hybrid series-parallel drivetrain. Fuel savings would generally be lower than expected with use of a full hybrid design, as the design does not facilitate high levels of regenerative braking or necessarily promote the use of smaller, lighter, more efficient internal combustion engines.

Examples

General Motors
General Motors mild hybrids including the Parallel Hybrid Truck (PHT) and numerous cars and SUVs equipped with the BAS Hybrid system, often use a 36- to 48-volt system to supply the power needed for the startup motor, as well as a source of power to compensate for the increasing number of electronic accessories on modern vehicles. GM's belt alternator starter (BAS) mild hybrid system uses a belt drive to start the internal combustion engine (ICE) through its motor–generator unit (MGU), then once started the engine drives the 14.5 kW motor-generator to charge the batteries. The BAS hybrid system also utilizes regenerative braking to replenish the system's 36 V battery and can provide moderate levels of power assist. According to the EPA, a 2009 Saturn Vue Greenline equipped with the BAS Hybrid system delivers a 27% improvement in combined fuel economy over the non-hybrid version (FWD 4cyl).

Honda

Honda's Integrated Motor Assist directly attaches a brushless DC motor between the flywheel and transaxle, providing both assistance during acceleration and regeneration during coasting/braking. It has been produced in various voltages and power outputs, as dictated by the size and weight of the vehicle application. Models equipped with the Integrated Motor Assist include the Honda Insight (1999–2006, 2009–2014), Honda Jazz (2011– ) Honda Civic (2003–2015), Honda Accord (2005–2007), and CR-Z (2010–2016).

Others

During the 2008 Olympic Games in Beijing in August, Chinese automobile manufacturer Chang'an Motors supplied a number of hybrid-drive cars as taxis for the athletes and spectators. The power electronics for the "mild hybrid" drive was supplied by Infineon.

Toyota sold mild hybrid versions of the Toyota Crown executive sedan between 2001 and 2003 and the mid-size Crown Sedan between 2002 and 2008 in the Japanese domestic market. These models combined a BAS hybrid system with the standard straight-6 petrol engines for increased fuel economy. Toyota now sells a full hybrid version of the Crown under their brand name Hybrid Synergy Drive.

MINI and BMW have start and stop, and some with regenerative braking, in all of their vehicles sold in Europe running 4-cylinder engines with manual transmissions.
 
Citroën proposes a stop and start system on its C2 and C3 models. The concept-car C5 Airscape has an improved version of that, adding regenerative braking and traction assistance functionalities, and ultracapacitors for energy buffering.

In 2004 VW brought two mild hybrid concept cars to Shanghai for the Challenge Bibendum.

Suzuki has announced the Suzuki Baleno with integrated SHVS-technology in 2016 on the new Suzuki HEARTECT platform. Suzuki has had experience with this mild-hybrid technology in their Suzuki Ciaz.

Most hybrids use gasoline engines, but some use Diesel engines, such as the Hyundai 1.6.
In 2021 Land Rover started selling the Range Rover Sport D350 which runs on the 3.0-litre D300 Ingenium Diesel engine.

See also
 BAS hybrid (eAssist)
 Integrated Motor Assist
 Micro HEV

References

Hybrid powertrain
Hybrid vehicles

de:Hybridelektrokraftfahrzeug#Mild-Hybrid